Manjeri State assembly constituency is one of the 140 state legislative assembly constituencies in Kerala state in southern India. It is also one of the 7 state legislative assembly constituencies included in the Malappuram Lok Sabha constituency. As of the 2021 assembly elections, the current MLA is U. A. Latheef of IUML.

Local self governed segments
Manjeri Niyamasabha constituency is composed of the following local self governed segments:

{ "type": "ExternalData",  "service": "geoshape",  "ids": "Q16134188,Q13112582,Q16133807,Q16135657,Q13110667"}

Members of Legislative Assembly
The following list contains all members of Kerala legislative assembly who have represented Manjeri Niyamasabha Constituency during the period of various assemblies:

Key

 

* indicates bypolls

Election results
Percentage change (±%) denotes the change in the number of votes from the immediate previous election.

Niyamasabha Election 2021 
There were 2,06,960 registered voters in the constituency for the 2021 Kerala Niyamasabha Election.

Niyama Sabha Election 2016
There were 1,90,277 registered voters in Manjeri Constituency for the 2016 Kerala Niyamasabha Election.

Niyamasabha Election 2011 
There were 1,64,144 registered voters in the constituency for the 2011 election.

See also
 Manjeri
 Malappuram district
 List of constituencies of the Kerala Legislative Assembly
 2016 Kerala Legislative Assembly election

References 

Assembly constituencies of Kerala

State assembly constituencies in Malappuram district